Ironclaw is a series of tabletop role-playing games created by Jason Holmgren of Sanguine Games, and features anthropomorphic characters in a setting inspired by class and religious conflicts during the Italian Renaissance. Jadeclaw is a related game in a concurrent East Asian setting.

Publication history 
The first edition of Ironclaw was published in 1999 by independent publisher Sanguine Games. In May 2002 it was voted the most-popular furry RPG in a public poll which included works of the same era such as World Tree and Furry Pirates. The second edition was published in 2010; it has since sold over 10,000 copies.

As of 2019, the game has been in continuous publication, with various add-on books such as The Book of Monsters featuring Ursula Vernon, and is run at furry conventions such as Furry Fiesta, Midwest FurFest and Anthrocon.

System 
Ironclaw uses a system where attributes of characters are matched to different polyhedral dice. These attributes include a character's physical, mental, and social capabilities, in addition to the abilities associated with their species. This system was later used in Sanguine's other role-playing games, including Jadeclaw.

Published books 
1st Edition (1999-2004): 
 Ironclaw Anthropomorphic Roleplaying Game
 House Rinaldi
 House Avoirdupois
 House Bisclavret
 House Doloreaux
 Phelan

2nd Edition (2010-present):
 Ironclaw Omnibus: Squaring the Circle (2011)
 The Book of Mysteries
 The Book of Jade (2012)
 The Book of Adventures (2014)
 The Book of Horn and Ivory (2017)
 The Book of Monsters (2019)

References 

Role-playing games introduced in 1999
Indie role-playing games
Fantasy role-playing games
Furry role-playing games